Semaeopus ella is a species of geometrid moth in the family Geometridae. It is found in North America.

The MONA or Hodges number for Semaeopus ella is 7141.

Subspecies
These two subspecies belong to the species Semaeopus ella:
 Semaeopus ella ella
 Semaeopus ella ellatina Hulst, 1896

References

Further reading

 
 

Cosymbiini
Articles created by Qbugbot
Moths described in 1896